Graphoderus zonatus is a species of beetle in family Dytiscidae. It is found in Austria, Belarus, Belgium, England,  Bulgaria, Croatia, the Czech Republic, mainland Denmark, Estonia, Finland, mainland France, Germany, Hungary, mainland Italy, Kaliningrad, Latvia, Lithuania, Luxembourg, Moldova, mainland Norway, Poland, Russia, Slovakia, Slovenia, Sweden, Switzerland, the Netherlands, Ukraine, and Yugoslavia.

References

External links

Graphoderus zonatus at Fauna Europaea

Dytiscidae
Beetles of Europe
Beetles described in 1795
Taxa named by David Heinrich Hoppe